The Banger Sisters is a 2002 American comedy film written and directed by Bob Dolman, and produced by Fox Searchlight Pictures. The film stars Goldie Hawn and Susan Sarandon as two middle-aged women who used to be friends and groupies when they were young.

Released on September 20, 2002, the film was Hawn's last acting role until the release of Snatched in 2017, fourteen and a half years after the film's release.

Plot
When Suzette is fired from her job as bartender at the Whisky a Go Go in Los Angeles, she promptly decides to travel to Phoenix, Arizona to see her old friend Vinnie. Stranded at a service station without any money to buy some gasoline, she picks up neurotic, middle-aged author Harry Plummer, who is heading to Phoenix to permanently deal with his father's negative influence over his life.

On arriving in Phoenix, Suzette has a chance encounter with Vinnie's 17-year-old daughter Hannah who, after some recreational drug use, starts throwing up in Harry's hotel room. When she drives her back to her parents' elegant suburban home, Suzette initially cannot believe what she sees: Vinnie, who now calls herself Lavinia Kingsley, leads the more conservative life of the perfect wife and mother—a life which at one point prompts one of her daughters to ask Suzette, "Did she ever do anything wrong?" Raymond, Vinnie's lawyer husband and an aspiring politician, is also unaware about his wife's past.

However, Suzette's sudden appearance brings back all those memories for Lavinia. She cuts her hair and throws off her expensive but boring clothes and, just for one night, relives the old days by going dancing with Suzette. They return to Vinnie's home and down in the basement she retrieves some of the memorabilia of their previous life as groupies, which includes a collection of Polaroids of the penises of numerous "musicians and a few roadies". After smoking a marijuana joint they set off the smoke detector, waking up the household.

Ginger has a minor fender bender which has everyone off to the hospital. Vinnie has an identity crisis during a family argument where Hannah blames Suzette for disrupting their lives. Suzette leaves and calls Harry telling him she's going back to Los Angeles. Vinnie follows Suzette and they have a heart to heart that ends up with them sitting atop a "Got Milk?" billboard sign to watch the sunrise.

The pair go to the hotel room to find Harry has left. Suzette fears the worst as Harry has taken a gun with him. They find Harry going to see his father, in a cemetery. While Suzette tries to talk sense into Harry, Vinnie loses her patience and bumps into him with the car. Suzette takes the gun and shoots the single bullet into the air. Harry finally comes to grips with his deceased, absentee father.

In the end, both Lavinia's husband and her two daughters have understood that she is only human after all. In her graduation speech, Hannah speaks out against anything that is "fake" and urges her schoolmates, teachers and the parents present to "do it true".

The following day, Suzette returns to Los Angeles together with Harry, who has come to consider her his muse.

Cast
 Goldie Hawn as Suzette
 Susan Sarandon as Lavinia "Vinnie" Kingsley
 Geoffrey Rush as Harry Plummer
 Erika Christensen as Hannah Kingsley
 Robin Thomas as Raymond Kingsley
 Eva Amurri as Ginger Kingsley
 Matthew Carey as Jules
 Andre Ware as Jake the Bartender
 Adam Tomei as Club Owner
 Sal Lopez as Pump Attendant
 Kohl Sudduth as Hotel Clerk
 Tinsley Grimes as Prom Girl
 Larry Krask as Man in Bar
 Marlayna Garrett as Young Groupie
 Buckcherry as Themselves

Reception 
The film was released on September 20, 2002. It opened at #2, in 2,738 theaters (setting a record as Fox Searchlight's largest-ever theatrical release, which it would hold until their release of Ready or Not in 2019 at 2,820 theaters), grossing $10,037,846 during its opening weekend. It went on to gross $30,307,416 domestically and $7,760,937 from international markets, for a worldwide total of $38,068,353.

Critical response 
On Rotten Tomatoes the film has an approval rating of 48% based on reviews from 143 critics. The site's consensus states: "Hawn and Sarandon are terrific together, but the hoary plot is predictable and contrived." On Metacritic the film has a score of 48% based on reviews from 33 critics, indicating "mixed or average reviews". Audiences surveyed by CinemaScore gave the film a grade "B+" on scale of A to F.

Roger Ebert of the Chicago Sun-Times gave it 3 out of 4, calling it "Pretty thin, but you grin while you're watching it."

Soundtrack

References

External links
 
 
 

2002 films
2002 comedy films
2002 directorial debut films
2000s buddy comedy films
2000s English-language films
2000s female buddy films
American buddy comedy films
American female buddy films
Films about groupies
Films scored by Trevor Rabin
Films set in Arizona
Films shot in California
Films shot in New Jersey
Films shot in New York (state)
Fox Searchlight Pictures films
Films about mother–daughter relationships
2000s American films